Zak Ruggiero (born 9 January 2001) is an English footballer who plays as a forward for Italian  club Cerignola.

Club career
On 11 September 2019, he signed his first professional contract with Crotone for a term of 5 years.

He made his Serie B debut for Crotone on 29 December 2019 in a game against Trapani. He substituted Junior Messias in the 85th minute.

On 25 September 2020 he was loaned to Serie C club Pro Vercelli. On 1 February 2021, he was sent on another Serie C loan to Pro Sesto.

On 31 August 2021, he was loaned to Lucchese, again in Serie C.

On 26 July 2022, Ruggiero signed with Cerignola.

Personal life
His father is Italian and his mother English.  He was born in England but moved to Crotone a few months later.

References

External links
 
 

2001 births
Living people
Sportspeople from Bishop Auckland
Footballers from County Durham
English people of Italian descent
Italian people of English descent
English footballers
Italian footballers
Association football forwards
Serie B players
Serie C players
F.C. Crotone players
F.C. Pro Vercelli 1892 players
S.S.D. Pro Sesto players
Lucchese 1905 players
S.S.D. Audace Cerignola players